Experience is a reggae album by Lincoln Thompson and the Royal Rasses released in 1979 and recorded in Jamaica. The songs were dedicated to Bintia Thompson.

Track listing
All tracks composed by Lincoln Thompson
"Nobody Here But Me"
"Blessed Are The Meek"
"Slave Driver"
"You Gotta Have Love (Jah Love)"
"Babylon Is Falling"
"True Experience"
"For Once In My Life"
"Walk In Jah Light"
"Jungle Fever"
"Thanksgiving"

Personnel
Prince Lincoln Thompson - guitar, vocals
Ernest Ranglin, Diggles, George Miller - guitar
Errol "Bagga" Walker, Val Douglas - bass
Leroy "Horsemouth" Wallace, Mikey Booth - drums
"Deadly" Headley Bennett, Bobby Ellis, Frankie Bubbler, Tommy McCook - horns
Earl "Wire" Lindo, Pablo Black, Cecil Lloyd, Geoffrey Chung - keyboards
Clinton Hall, Keith Peterkin - background vocals
Brother Jamo, Uziah "Sticky" Thompson - percussion
Mixed by Sylvan Morris at Harry J. Studio

Lincoln Thompson albums
1979 albums